Viraivil Isai is a 2015 Indian Tamil-language drama film directed by V. S. Prabhakaran and stars Mahendran, Dilip Rogger, Sanjay Shankar, Shruti Ramakrishnan and Arpana.

Cast 
Mahendran as Susi 
Dilip Rogger as Ram 
 Sanjay Shankar as Shankar 
Shruti Ramakrishnan as Lekha
 Arpana as Kavya
Delhi Ganesh as a tea stall owner

Production 
The film's director worked under G. N. R. Kumaravelan. Mahendran plays a man who abandons his girlfriend to become a film director. The film was shot at Kodambakkam.

Reception 
Malini Mannath of The New Indian Express wrote that "Neither meaningful nor entertaining, It’s a film that has nothing to offer a viewer". M. Suganth of The Times of India said that "The story might seem intriguing, but the film actually takes quite an effort to sit through". A critic from Nettv4u wrote that "The film will connect with the youngsters".

References 

2010s Tamil-language films
2015 films
2015 drama films
Indian drama films